Stapylton County is one of the 141 Cadastral divisions of New South Wales. It is located to the south of the Barwon River and includes part of the Newell Highway.

Stapylton County was named in honour of the geologist Granville William Chetwynd Stapylton (1800-1840).

Parishes 
A full list of parishes found within this county; their current LGA and mapping coordinates to the approximate centre of each location is as follows:

References

Counties of New South Wales